Franklin Benjamin Porter (March 23, 1886 – May 9, 1977), was a pioneer businessman and real estate developer of Monterey Peninsula. In 1926, he launched the first residential subdivision in Carmel Valley, California that became Robles del Rio, California (Spanish: Robles del Río, meaning "Oaks of the River"). Porter went on to develop other properties in the valley including the Robles del Rio Lodge, Robles del Rio Carmelo Water Company, and the Hatton Ranch (once the Rancho Cañada de la Segunda) in Carmel Valley.

Early life 

Frank Porter was born on March 23, 1886, in Georgetown, California, the youngest of 6 children. His parents, Addison Walter Porter (1832-1895) and Josephine M. Jones (1848-1925) came to California from Indiana. They settled in Georgetown and later moved to Pacific Grove, California where his father died in 1895. After the 1906 San Francisco earthquake the Porters moved to Salinas, California. Soon after his father's death, Porter quit high school and worked at odd jobs to support his family. He later completed his education at night school while still working. His sister, Maud Elsie Porter (1873-1973) married Thomas Albert Work (1870-1963), a businessman and banker of Pacific Grove.

Professional life

In 1909, Frank Porter worked as a note teller for the Bank of Italy in San Francisco that became Bank of America.

Porter married Jet Louise Towt (1889-1979) on May 25, 1913, in San Francisco by Rev. J. W. Horn. She grew up on her family's Towt Ranch on Mount Toro (now part of the Dorrance Ranch). They had two children during their marriage, Peggy Kathleen Porter (1914-2014) and Paul Franklin Porter (1917-1985) who were raised in Salinas. His son Paul, developed the Carmel Valley's Rancho Cañada and Tierra Grande subdivisions with help from his father. His daughter, Peggy married Milton A. Marquard in 1936. In 1948, Peggy and her brother Paul developed the Porter-Marquard Realty office that was at the corner of Carmel Valley and Boronda Road.

By 1918, Porter moved back to Salinas and started the Frank B. Porter Lumber Co., at the corner of Alisal and Monterey streets in Salinas. He registerd for the US World War I Draft Registration in Salinas later that year. In 1920, he went into partnership with George Schultzberg with a Chevrolet agency for both Salinas and King City areas. In 1928, he built the 11-unit Porter Apartments at Pajaro and Maple streets in Salinas, which he sold in 1937 for $26,000. In 1926, Porter built the Maple Park subdivision in Salinas, which was designed to have large residential lots, spacious landscaping, and unified architectural designs.

Robles del Rio

In June 1926 Frank, and Jet with partners George S. Gould, Jr., & Cozzens, bought  of wooded hillside at the southeast corner of the  Rancho Los Laureles from the Del Monte Properties Company. They named the tract (Spanish: Robles del Rio.) In 1926, the Robles del Rio sales office was built. The Robles del Rio subdivision was laid out by Porter. In 1929, the Porters moved from Salinas to Robles del Rio on a home on Salsipuedes Road overlooking the Carmel River. In 1930, Porter bought out their partners and built the Robles del Rio Country Club at 200 Punta Del Monte, Carmel Valley.

The Country Club opened to promote sales and as a club for residents. In 1932, it was renamed the Robles del Rio Lodge. For decades the lodge offered members swimming, indoor and outdoor dining, the Valley's first a 9-hole,  golf course, tennis courts, horse stables, and a social hall. There were 31 rooms for guests. Club dues wee $1 per month with an initial member ship fee of $75 for property owners. The Ridge restaurant looked out over the valley.

Porter sold the Robles del Rio lodge on February 15, 1939, to David Prince and William "Bill" Wood of San Francisco. In May 2010, the Robles del Rio Lodge was destroyed by fire after being vacant for several years. The Carmel Valley fire department could not determine the cause of the fire.

In 1932, Porter formed the Robles del Rio Carmelo Water Company to provide water to the residents. After the golf course was discontinued in 1941, he deeded its  meadow to the Water Company. It is still used today for recreational purposes.

Rosie's Cracker Barrel

The Robles del Rio sales office became a general store in the 1930s. William Irwin "Rosie" Henry bought the store in 1939 and renamed it to Rosie's Cracker Barrel. A gas station was next to the store. He operated the store until his death in 1982.

In 1941, the Robles del Rio Post Office was founded in the store with Rosie as postmaster until 1949 when it was relocated to Carmel Valley Village.

From the 1940s to the 1960s Rosie's Cracker Barrel was a social center for Carmel Valley. Rosie was a grocery store clerk, bartender, postmaster, cook and gas station attendant. Cartoon sketches done by Virgil Partch, Frank O'Neal, and Hank Ketcham were displayed on the walls in the store.

Other developments

In 1936, Porter acquired  of the Marion Hollins ranch in Carmel Valley for $32,000. Hollins was an athlete and a golf course developer. Porter sold a portion of the ranch to real estate developer Byington Ford for what is now the Carmel Valley Village.

In 1937, Porter and his partner Milton A. Marquard opened a new restricted subdivision four miles from Carmel on Carmel Valley Road named "Carmel Hills." Acreage was advertised at $300 ) per acre.

In May 1946, Frank and his son Paul Porter bought the  farm from Muriel Vanderbilt Adams for an estimated $200,000. It was converted into the Rancho Del Monte subdivision and Rancho Del Monte Country Club, now the Los Laureles Lodge. The Porter-Marquard Realty office was built in 1948 at the corner of Carmel Valley and Boronda Road. They built a bridge from Boronda Road across the Carmel Valley river to Garzas Road in 1949.

On May 19, 1949, 30 Carmel Valley residents met with the postmaster Norman Marshall at the Las Laureles Lodge to discuss a postal name change. It was decided that mail would be addressed to "Carmel Valley, Calif." instead of "Carmel Valley Route, Robles del Rio, Calif.," since Robles del Rio was relatively unknown at the time compared to Carmel Valley.

In July 1955, Porter purchased the  Hatton Ranch (once Rancho Cañada de la Segunda) in Carmel Valley for $200,000. It was located three miles up the valley on both sides of Carmel Valley Road. The land had been under lease to Kenneth Martin for cattle grazing. Porter subdivided  for homes and sold the remaining  as a ranch.

In 1962, the Porter-Marquard Realty developed the Rancho Tierra Grande subdivision in Carmel Valley, up the hillside, above Carmel Valley Road, across from the Mid-Valley Shopping Center. There are 208 homesites with lots  to 1+ acres.

Death

Porter died on May 9, 1977, in Carmel-by-the-Sea, California, at the age of 91. His wife, Jet died at age 89 in Carmel on January 29, 1979. Her funeral and cremation took place at the Little Chapel by the Sea in Pacific Grove. She was survived by a daughter, a son, four grandchildren and six great-grandchildren.

Legacy

Frank and Jet Porter helped develop much of Carmel Valley. Today, Robles del Rio, California, laid out by Frank Porter in 1926, is an unincorporated community in Monterey County, California. Its original  meadow is still used today for recreational purposes by the Robles del Rio community.

See also
 Timeline of Carmel-by-the-Sea, California
 Hatton Fields

References

External links

 The History Of Carmel Valley's Robles Del Rio Subdivision
 Laureles Lodge

1886 births
1977 deaths
People from Carmel-by-the-Sea, California